Train Busters (aka R.C.A.F. Train-Busters; its alternate French language version was known as  La guerre des airs) is a 13-minute 1943 Canadian documentary film, directed by Sydney Newman. The film was made by the Royal Canadian Air Force (RCAF) Overseas Film Unit and the National Film Board of Canada (NFB) as part of the NFB's Canada Carries On series. Train Busters depicts the Allied night bombing campaign over German-occupied Europe that was complemented by close air support missions flown by the RCAF targeting enemy trains.

Synopsis
In 1943, the RCAF strength and equipment consists of 32 overseas squadrons based in England. Two fundamental missions were essential to the Allied air strategy: night bombing and interdiction. While bombers struck at the heart of occupied Europe, the German war machine reacted by sending out supplies to their far-flung European bases by rail. The RCAF disrupted the "nerve centres" by attacking the rail system. These specialized ground attack fighters were extremely successful, with fighter-bombers destroying munition trains.

Production

Typical of the NFB's wartime series of documentary short films, Train Busters relied heavily on military assistance in obtaining stock footage. The film incorporated footage shot over a period of time from 1939–1943. While the aerial sequences were limited to available footage, some of the aerial scenes were shot in Canada and carefully edited with other footage obtained from the British Ministry of Information as well as other sources, including pre-war German films.

The RCAF aircraft in Train Busters encompassed most of the types used in Bomber and Fighter Commands, by the RCAF in 1943, including:
 de Havilland Mosquito medium bomber/fighter-bomber
 Handley Page Halifax heavy bomber
 Hawker Hurricane fighter/fighter-bomber
 North American Mustang I reconnaissance/fighter-bomber
 Short Stirling heavy bomber
 Supermarine Spitfire fighter, fighter-bomber
 Vickers Wellington medium bomber

Reception
As part of the NFB's newsreel programs, Train Busters was produced for both the military and the theatrical market. As R.C.A.F. Train-Busters, the film was issued to military bases on May 25, 1943, as Newsreel of the Week: Issue No. 8, part of the Canadian Army newsreel series.

Each film in NFB's Canada Carries On series was shown over a six-month period as part of the shorts or newsreel segments in approximately 800 theatres across Canada. The NFB had an arrangement with Famous Players theatres to ensure that Canadians from coast to coast could see them, with further distribution by Columbia Pictures.

After the six-month theatrical tour ended, individual films were made available on 16 mm to schools, libraries, churches and factories, extending the life of these films for another year or two. They were also made available to film libraries operated by university and provincial authorities. Although available from the National Film Board either online or as a DVD, Train Busters is now largely forgotten.

Historian Malek Khouri analyzed the role of the NFB wartime documentaries, with Train Busters characterized as an example of a propaganda film. "During the early years of the NFB, its creative output was largely informed by the turbulent political and social climate the world was facing. World War II, Communism, unemployment, the role of labour unions, and working conditions were all subjects featured by the NFB during the period from 1939 to 1946". In Filming Politics, Khouri described a "new-found fascination" with technological advances in winning the war, especially through the use of air power.

References

Notes

Citations

Bibliography

 Ellis, Jack C. and Betsy A. McLane. New History of Documentary Film. London: Continuum International Publishing Group, 2005. .
 Khouri, Malek. Filming Politics: Communism and the Portrayal of the Working Class at the National Film Board of Canada, 1939-46. Calgary, Alberta, Canada: University of Calgary Press, 2007. .

External links
 
 Watch Train Busters at NFB.ca.

1943 films
1943 short films
1943 documentary films
Black-and-white documentary films
Canadian aviation films
Canadian short documentary films
Canadian World War II propaganda films
Canadian black-and-white films
Documentary films about Europe
Documentary films about military aviation
English-language Canadian films
National Film Board of Canada documentaries
Canada Carries On
Quebec films
Columbia Pictures short films
Films directed by Sydney Newman
1940s Canadian films